Kanmanikal is a 1966 Indian Malayalam-language film,  directed by J. Sasikumar and produced by P. Ramakrishnan. The film stars Prem Nazir, Sharada, Adoor Bhasi and Thikkurissy Sukumaran Nair. The film had musical score by G. Devarajan.

Cast
Prem Nazir
Sharada
Adoor Bhasi
Thikkurissy Sukumaran Nair
Kamala
Baby Ajitha
Kottarakkara Sreedharan Nair
Master Narayanan
Meena

Soundtrack
The music was composed by G. Devarajan and the lyrics were written by Vayalar Ramavarma.

References

External links
 

1966 films
1960s Malayalam-language films
Films directed by J. Sasikumar